Overnutrition (also known as hyperalimentation) is a form of malnutrition in which the intake of nutrients is oversupplied. The amount of nutrients exceeds the amount required for normal growth, development, and metabolism. 

The term can also refer to:
 Obesity, a disorder which occurs by eating more calories than one burns, as well as:
 Oversupplying a specific nutrient, such as dietary minerals or vitamin poisoning.

For mineral excess, see:
 Iron poisoning, and
 Low sodium diet (a response to excess sodium).

Overnutrition may also refer to greater food consumption than appropriate, as well as other feeding procedures such as parenteral nutrition.

See also
Undernutrition
Calorie restriction

References

External links

 
Nutrition
Malnutrition